Clemensia cernitis is a moth of the family Erebidae first described by Herbert Druce in 1897. It is found in Mexico.

References

Cisthenina
Moths described in 1897